Anthicinae is a subfamily of ant-like flower beetles in the family Anthicidae.

Genera
These 38 genera belong to the subfamily Anthicinae:

 Acanthinus LaFerté-Sénectère, 1849 i c g b
 Amblyderus LaFerté-Sénectère, 1849 i c g b
 Andrahomanus Pic, 1903 g
 Anthelephila Hope, 1833 i c g
 Anthicomorphus Lewis, 1895 g
 Anthicus Paykull, 1798 i c g b
 Aulacoderus La Ferte-Senectere, 1849 g
 Baulius Casey, 1895 i c g
 Chileanthicus Werner, 1966 g
 Clavicollis Marseul, 1879 g
 Cordicollis Marseul, 1879 g
 Cyclodinus Mulsant & Rey, 1866 i c g b
 Endomia LaPorte de Castelnau, 1840 g
 Euvacusus Casey, 1904 i c g b
 Floydwernerius Telnov, 2007
 Formicilla LeConte, 1851 i c g b
 Hirticollis Marseul, 1879 g
 Hirticomus Pic, 1894 g
 Ischyropalpus LaFerté-Sénectère, 1849 i c g b
 Leptaleus La Ferté-Sénectère, 1849 g
 Leptanthicus Werner, 1958 i c g b
 Liparoderus La Ferté-Sénectère, 1849 g
 Malporus Casey, 1895 i c g b
 Mecynotarsus LaFerté-Sénectère, 1847 i c g b
 Microhoria Chevrolat, 1877 g
 Nitorus Telnov, 2007 g
 Notoxus Geoffroy, 1762 i c g b
 Omonadus Mulsant & Rey, 1866 i c g b
 Pseudocyclodinus Telnov, 2003 g
 Pseudoleptaleus Pic, 1901 g
 Sapintus Casey, 1895 i c g b
 Squamanotoxus Chandler, 2001 i c g b 
 Stenidius La Ferte-Senectere, 1847 g
 Stricticollis Marseul, 1879 g b
 Tanarthrus LeConte, 1851 i c g b
 Tenuicomus Pic, 1894 g
 Vacusus Casey, 1895 i c g b
 Yunnanomonticola Telnov, 2002

Data sources: i = ITIS, c = Catalogue of Life, g = GBIF, b = Bugguide.net

References

Anthicidae